Tarah Marie Wheeler (born February 12, 1979) is an American technology and cybersecurity author, public speaker, entrepreneur and executive. She is currently CEO of Red Queen Dynamics and Senior Fellow of Global Cyber Policy at the Council on Foreign Relations, and she is the author of Women in Tech.

Early life and education 
Wheeler received her bachelor's degree from Carroll College and a master's degree in political science from Portland State University.  In 2004, she was named a National Science Foundation-funded fellow at the Center for the Study of Complex Systems at the University of Michigan. In 2021, Tarah was granted Fulbright Scholar Award.

Career

In 2012, Wheeler founded now-defunct employee management company Fizzmint.

From 2012 to 2014 Wheeler was a systems architect at mobile encryption firm Silent Circle.

In 2014, Wheeler founded Infosec Unlocked, a non-profit whose goal is to help bring more diverse voices to infosec conferences across the United States through paper writing events and scholarships. This was an extension of her YouTube series where she discussed diversity topics, "DEF CON Unlocked." This series mostly covered topics relating to diversity at the hacker conference DEF CON, one of the world's largest hacker conferences.

In 2016, Wheeler was named a Cybersecurity Passcode Influencer by Christian Science Monitor and spoke to the Federal Trade Commission on information security in tech startups.

After a Kickstarter campaign, Wheeler published Women in Tech, a book dedicated to teaching women how to succeed in tech careers. The book was published with several contributors, including Esther Dyson and Brianna Wu, one of the targets of the Gamergate controversy.

Wheeler served as the Website Cybersecurity Czar at Symantec, but in August 2017 announced on Twitter that she left the firm to work on several books. In October, she was awarded the inaugural "Women Leaders in Cybersecurity Award" from NYU. 

Wheeler and her husband Deviant Ollam helped cybersecurity expert Marcus Hutchins with his bail in August 2017 and to house him in Los Angeles during his arraignment period while he was investigated by the FBI on charges related to the Kronos rootkit.

She had been Senior Director, Data Trust & Threat and Vulnerability Management at Splunk.

Wheeler has been cited in national media on issues relating to cybersecurity such as cyberterrorism, malware and data breaches and has written about cyberwar policy.

Bibliography

Books 

 Tarah Wheeler Van Vlack, Women in Tech: Take Your Career to the Next Level with Practical Advice and Inspiring Stories, 2016, Hardback ISBN 978-1-63217-140-5

Poker 
Wheeler has competed in the World Series of Poker with $4,722 in lifetime cashes. In Women in Tech, Wheeler notes that interests such as poker can be useful in business, the same way golf can be.

References

External links

 Personal site
 

1979 births
Living people
21st-century American non-fiction writers
21st-century American women writers
Activists from Washington (state)
American business writers
Women business writers
American computer businesspeople
American feminist writers
American technology chief executives
American technology writers
Businesspeople from Portland, Oregon
Businesspeople from Seattle
People associated with computer security
Gen Digital people
Splunk people
Writers from Portland, Oregon
Writers from Seattle
American women non-fiction writers